Wildling may refer to:

 Wildling (band), an indie rock band from Los Angeles, previously known as Test Your Reflex
 Wildling (character), one of a group of characters in George R. R. Martin's A Song of Ice and Fire series and the TV adaptation Game of Thrones
 Wildling (film), a 2018 film starring Bel Powley, Liv Tyler, and Brad Dourif